Irène Tunc (25 September 1935 – 16 January 1972) was a French actress and model. She was crowned Miss France in 1954. She was the wife of film director Alain Cavalier and she died in a car crash in 1972. She appeared in 35 films and television shows between 1955 and 1971.

Selected filmography
 Camilla (1954)
 Bravissimo (1955)
 Les Truands (1956)
Lazzarella (1957)
 Paris Holiday (1958)
 La sposa (1958)
 Noi siamo due evasi (1959)
 Cavalier in Devil's Castle (1959)
 The Conqueror of the Orient (1960)
 Le signore (1960)
 Léon Morin, Priest (1961)
 Live for Life (1967)
 Je t'aime, je t'aime (1968)
 Two English Girls (1971)

References

External links

1935 births
1972 deaths
French film actresses
Road incident deaths in France
Miss France winners
French female models
People from Nord (French department)
20th-century French actresses
Signatories of the 1971 Manifesto of the 343